56th National Board of Review Awards
December 17, 1984

Best Picture: 
 A Passage to India 
The 56th National Board of Review Awards were announced on 17 December 1984.

Top Ten Films 
A Passage to India
Paris, Texas
The Killing Fields
Places in the Heart
Mass Appeal
Country
A Soldier's Story
Birdy
Careful, He Might Hear You
Under the Volcano

Top Foreign films 
A Sunday in the Country
Carmen
A Love in Germany
The Fourth Man
The Basileus Quartet

Winners
Best Picture:
A Passage to India
Best Foreign Language Film:
Un dimanche à la campagne (A Sunday in the Country), France 
Best Actor:
Victor Banerjee - A Passage to India
Best Actress:
Peggy Ashcroft - A Passage to India
Best Supporting Actor:
John Malkovich - Places in the Heart
Best Supporting Actress:
Sabine Azéma - Un dimanche à la campagne (A Sunday in the Country)
Best Director:
David Lean - A Passage to India
Career Achievement Award:
John Huston

External links 
National Board of Review of Motion Pictures :: Awards for 1984

1984
1984 film awards
1984 in American cinema